The 2016 Men's Ice Hockey World Championships was the 80th such event hosted by the International Ice Hockey Federation. Teams participated at several levels of competition. The competition also served as qualifications for division placements in the 2017 competition.

Championship (top division)
The tournament took place in Russia from 6 May to 22 May 2016.

Division I
Group A was held in Katowice, Poland from 23–29 April 2016 and Group B in Zagreb, Croatia from 17–23 April 2016.

Group A

Group B

Division II
Group A was held in Jaca, Spain and Group B in Mexico City, Mexico from 9–15 April 2016.

Group A

Group B

Division III

The tournament was held in Istanbul, Turkey from 31 March to 6 April 2016. Prior to the start of the tournament the United Arab Emirates withdrew, leaving six teams to play.  Due to eligibility violations all of Georgia's games were declared 5–0 forfeits.

References

External links
Official website

 
World Ice Hockey Championships - Men's
IIHF Men's World Ice Hockey Championships